Ove Alexander Billington (born 10 August 1979) is a Norwegian jazz pianist and composer, known as the band leader within his own Billington Trio and for his participation in bands such as Independent Jazz Orchestra, Speak Low, Mads Berven Quartet and Kjellerbandet.

Early life 
Billington was born in Fredrikstad, Norway.  He studied music on the Jazz program at Trondheim Musikkonsevatorium (2002).

Later life and career
While at university he started the Billington Trio including fellow students Andreas Amundsen (double bass) and Hermund Nygård (drums). He also collaborated with fellow students in the band Stjern including Stina Moltu (vocals), Andreas Amundsen and Hermund Nygård.

He joined the Inge Stangvik Quintet including Håvard Fossum (saxophone), Stig Hvalryg (bass) and Hermund Nygård (drums), and in the duo Yours Truly with Gine Gaustad Anderssen.

Billington collaborates within the quintet of Danish singer Majken Christiansen. He worked sporadically with musicians including Ole Jørn Myklebust, Yasuhito Mori, Tore Johansen, Petter Wettre, Bjørn Johan Muri, Staffan William-Olsson, Bodil Niska and Nora Brockstedt, and in the bands Funky Butt and The Sinatra Songbook. In 2013 he performed with vocalist Dina Nordsjø and his band, including Lars Martin Skjørshammer (bass) and Jakop Jansønn (drums), at Oslo Konserthus.

Discography 

 1997: Det er makt i de foldede hender (1997), album med Svenn-Erik Fjeldheim
 2001: Synergy (2001), within "Fredrikstad Storband"
 2004: I Fall in Love To Easily (Liphone), with Grethe Kruse
 2008: Jul i Halden (2008), with various artists
 2009: Yours Truly (Jazzaway), with "Yours Truly"
 2009: Walk With Me (2009), with Ina Grefslie
 2009: Jul i Halden (2009), with various artists
 2011: Speak Love (2011), with Majken Christiansen

References

External links 

 Ove Alexander Billington on MIC.no
 Billington Trio on MIC.no

1979 births
Living people

20th-century Norwegian pianists
21st-century Norwegian pianists
Avant-garde jazz musicians
Norwegian jazz pianists
Norwegian jazz composers
Norwegian University of Science and Technology alumni
Musicians from Fredrikstad